The Admiralty Civilian Shore Wireless Service (ACSWS) was  a radio service and network of wireless stations operated by the British Royal Navy based at Irton Moor, Scarborough, North Yorkshire, England from 1939 to 1956.

History
In 1912 the Royal Navy built Wireless Telegraphy Station at Scarborough, England in 1912. At the outbreak of World War I its main responsibilities was signals intelligence. After World War I it was primarily involved with monitoring diplomatic communications.

In 1932, a proposal was made to close Scarborough, and to transfer operations to Flowerdown, Hampshire; fortunately this decision was reversed and in 1935 our interception of the German Navy was restarted. At the beginning of August 1939, Y Service, the organisation responsible for intercepting enemy and neutral radio transmissions, were prepared for war. Scarborough intercepted German Naval and Naval Air communications, and controlled a Direction-Finding network.

It was during this period that the civilians working in Sigint for the Admiralty became known as the Admiralty Civilian Shore Wireless Service (ACSWS), and the complement soon became a mix of both civilian and service personnel, augmented during the war years by members of the Women's Royal Naval Service. During May 1941, the station at Scarborough played a key role in the location and subsequent destruction of the German battleship Bismarck. The following is an extract from a review of ‘Y Work’, written by Lt. Cmdr. WR Rodger, Officer in Charge, Scarborough, 15 November 1945:

Post World War II the Admiralty Civilian Shore Wireless Service role was monitor and collect communications of the Soviet Armed Forces a role it maintained through the cold war period. In 1965 the Admiralty Civilian Shore Wireless Service's role and functions was amalgamated within Government Communications Headquarters, (GCHQ) where it was renamed the Composite Signals Organisation the wireless station at Scarborough became CSOS Irton Moor. Now known as GCHQ Scarborough.

See also
 GCHQ

References

Sources
Archives, The National. "TELECOMMUNICATIONS AND RADIO (93): Admiralty Civilian Shore Wireless Service: formation". discovery.nationalarchives.gov.uk. National Archives UK, ADM 1/10004, 1938-1939.
A short history of Sigint in Scarborough | GCHQ Site". www.gchq.gov.uk. Government Communications Headquarters, UK, 2018.

External links

Admiralty departments
Admiralty during World War II
1939 establishments in the United Kingdom
1965 disestablishments in the United Kingdom